Smithfield is a town in and the county seat of Johnston County, North Carolina, United States. As of the 2010 census, its population was 10,966, and in 2019 the estimated population was 12,985. Smithfield is home to the Ava Gardner Museum and is situated along the Neuse River, where visitors enjoy the annual Smithfield Ham and Yam Festival, walks along the Buffalo Creek Greenway, and the historic downtown district. The Raleigh-Durham-Cary combined statistical area has a population over 2 million residents.

History
Smithfield, founded near Smith's ferry on the Neuse River, was Johnston County's first town and second county seat. The county courthouse was moved from Hinton's Quarter to Smithfield in 1771. The settlement was first known as Johnston County Court House and was incorporated as Smithfield in 1777. The third North Carolina state legislature met in Smithfield in 1779 and 1780.

Geography 
Smithfield is in central Johnston County and is bordered to the northeast by Selma. Interstate 95 runs along the southeastern edge of the town, with access from Exits 93, 95, and 97. I-95 leads northeast  to Rocky Mount and southwest the same distance to Fayetteville. U.S. Route 301 passes through Selma on Brightleaf Boulevard, leading northeast  to the center of Selma and southwest  to Benson. U.S. Route 70 passes just northeast of Smithfield, leading northwest  to Raleigh, and southeast  to Goldsboro. U.S. Route 70 Business passes through the center of Smithfield as Market Street.

The Neuse River runs through the town west of the downtown area, separating it from the neighborhood of West Smithfield.

Demographics

2020 census

As of the 2020 United States census,  11,292 people, 4,951 households, and 2,919 families resided in the town.

2000 census
As of the census of 2000,  11,510 people, 4,417 households, and 2,676 families resided in the town. The population density was 1,007.6 inhabitants per square mile (389.1/km). The 4,674 housing units had an average density of 409.2 per square mile (158.0/km). The racial makeup of the town was 62.66% White, 30.99% African American, 0.43% Native American, 0.63% Asian, 4.16% from other races, and 1.13% from two or more races. Hispanics or Latinos of any race were 9.9% of the population.

Of the 4,417 households, 26.6% had children under 18 living with them, 42.1% were married couples living together, 14.9% had a female householder with no husband present, and 39.4% were not families. About 35.7% of all households were made up of individuals, and 16.3% had someone living alone who was 65 or older. The average household size was 2.30, and the average family size was 2.97.

In the town, the age distribution was 21.3% under the age of 18, 8.3% from 18 to 24, 29.2% from 25 to 44, 22.9% from 45 to 64, and 18.2% who were 65 or older. The median age was 39 years. For every 100 females, there were 99.4 males. For every 100 females 18 and over, there were 97.6 males.
The median income for a household in the town was $27,813, and for a family was $37,929. Males had a median income of $29,567 versus $24,440 for females. The per capita income for the town was $18,012. About 14.5% of families and 20.6% of the population were below the poverty line, including 27.1% of those under 18 and 19.2% of those 65 or over.

Government 
Smithfield has a council–manager form of government. The council, the town's legislative body, consists of seven members and a mayor. The council sets policy, and the manager oversees day-to-day operations.

Education 
 South Smithfield Elementary School
 West Smithfield Elementary School
 Smithfield Middle School
 South Campus Community School
 Johnston County Middle College High School
 Johnston County Early College Academy
 Smithfield-Selma High School
 Neuse Charter School
 Johnston Community College

Healthcare 
 UNC Health Care - Johnston Health

Notable people

See also 

 List of municipalities in North Carolina
 National Register of Historic Places listings in Johnston County, North Carolina

References

Further reading

External links 

 Government

 General information
 Ava Gardner Museum
 Downtown Smithfield Development Corporation
 
 Public Library of Johnston County and Smithfield
 Smithfield, North Carolina at Johnston County Visitors Bureau (johnstoncountync.org)

 
1777 establishments in North Carolina
County seats in North Carolina
Populated places established in 1777
Populated places on the Neuse River
Research Triangle
Towns in Johnston County, North Carolina
Towns in North Carolina